Leatherwood Creek is a stream in Iron and Madison County in the U.S. state of Missouri. It is a tributary of St. Francis River.

The stream headwaters arise in southeastern Iron County and it flows southeast into western Madison County parallel to Missouri Route C past the community of Jewett to its confluence with the St. Francis about four miles southwest of Rock Pile Mountain.

Leatherwood Creek was named for leatherwood near its course.

See also
List of rivers of Missouri

References

Rivers of Iron County, Missouri
Rivers of Madison County, Missouri
Rivers of Missouri